The World War II Veterans Memorial Highway may refer to:
 M-37 between US 10 and the Lake–Wexford county line in Michigan
 U.S. Route 41 in Wisconsin
 New Jersey Route 208
 Virginia State Route 288
Monuments and memorials in Virginia
World War II memorials in the United States